Norman Harry Poole MC (9 April 1920 – 26 June 2015) was a British soldier who was one of the first allied soldiers to land on occupied territory on D-Day in 1944. Poole won the Military Cross for his actions on that day and subsequently as he evaded capture by the enemy for six weeks.

Poole was born in Winchester and educated at Peter Symonds College. He joined the Hampshire Regiment in 1940, became an instructor at the Parachute Regiment Battle School, and transferred to 1st Special Air Service Regiment in 1943.

References

External links
http://normanharry.poole.muchloved.com/

1920 births
2015 deaths
British Army personnel of World War II
Special Air Service officers
Military personnel from Winchester
Royal Hampshire Regiment officers
People educated at Peter Symonds College